NGC 1267 is an elliptical galaxy located about 220 million light-years away in the constellation Perseus. NGC 1267 was discovered by astronomer Heinrich d'Arrest on February 14, 1863. NGC 1267 is a member of the Perseus Cluster and is possibly interacting with the spiral galaxy NGC 1268.

See also
 List of NGC objects (1001–2000)
 NGC 4567 and NGC 4568
 Eyes Galaxies

References

External links
 

Perseus Cluster
Perseus (constellation)
Elliptical galaxies
Interacting galaxies
1267
12331 
2657
Astronomical objects discovered in 1863